Cyligramma limacina is a moth of the family Erebidae. It is found in Africa, including Senegal, Mauritius and Madagascar.

Erebidae
Moths described in 1832